Huai Thalaeng railway station is a railway station located in Huai Thalaeng Subdistrict, Huai Thalaeng District, Nakhon Ratchasima Province.

References 

Railway stations in Thailand
Nakhon Ratchasima province